A list of films produced in Argentina in 1939:

1939
Films
Argentine